Gilbert William Bayes (4 April 1872 – 10 July 1953) was an English sculptor. His art works varied in scale from medals to large architectural clocks, monuments and equestrian statues and he was also a designer of some note, creating chess pieces, mirrors and cabinets.

Career

Bayes was born in London into a family of artists, his father being Alfred Walter Bayes, an established artist at the time. He was one of four children and brother to both the well-known artist and critic Walter Bayes, and to the Arts & Crafts designer Jessie Bayes. Gilbert Bayes studied at the City and Guilds of London Art School and then at the Royal Academy Schools between 1896 and 1899, where he won a gold medal and a travelling scholarship to Paris. Bayes' lengthy and illustrious career began as a student under Sir George Frampton and Harry Bates, and so became associated with the British New Sculpture movement and its focus on architectural sculpture. He first exhibited at the Royal Academy in London in 1889, aged 17. In Paris, Bayes won an honourable mention at the 1900 International Exhibition, then several medals at the Paris Salon and, in 1925, a gold medal and diploma of honour at the Exhibition of Decorative Art. His work was part of the sculpture event in the art competition at the 1928 Summer Olympics.

Bayes is perhaps best remembered for his interest in colour, his association with the Royal Doulton Company, and his work in polychrome ceramics and enamelled bronze. His 1939 major polychrome stonework frieze, Pottery through the Ages at the Doulton Headquarters in London was removed in the 1960s when the building was razed, and the 50 foot long work was re-located to the Victoria and Albert Museum.  He also designed a number of war memorials, with public works throughout the former British Empire, from New South Wales to Bangalore.

In 1896, Bayes was elected to the Art Workers' Guild, and in 1925 was elected to the position of Master. Bayes served as president of the Royal British Society of Sculptors, PRBS, from 1939 through 1944, and of the Ealing Art Group from 1947–1953. He died in London in 1953. Bayes' home at 4 Greville Place in St. John's Wood bears a blue plaque erected by English Heritage in 2007.

Personal life
In 1906, Bayes married Gertrude Smith, a fellow sculptor, in Farnham, Surrey. They had two children:
 Eleanor Jean Gilbert Bayes (1908–1999), also an artist
 Geoffrey Gilbert Bayes (1912–2001)

Works 
 Statues of Sir William Chambers and Sir Charles Barry and other exterior work at the Victoria and Albert Museum under Sir Aston Webb, London, circa 1909.
 Prehistoric Period and Classic Period, architectural sculpture at the National Museum Cardiff, 1914–1915
 Destiny, Albion Gardens, Ramsgate, Kent, dedicated 1920
 Hythe war memorial, Kent, 1921
 Todmorden War Memorial, West Yorkshire, 1921.
 The Offerings of Peace and The Offerings of War at the Art Gallery of New South Wales, 1923
 The National War Memorial, St. John's, Newfoundland and Labrador, 1924. The bronze figures for the memorial were cast by Ercole James Parlanti of London.
 The Building of King Solomon's Temple, Central Warwickshire Masonic Temple (demolished), Birmingham, 1927 (frieze in store)
 The Queen of Time bronze group above the Oxford Street entrance to Selfridges department store, London, 1928 
 Drama Through the Ages, polychrome ceramic frieze for the Saville Theatre (now the Odeon Covent Garden cinema), London, 1931
 The Segrave Trophy, 1932
 About 200 sculpted figures executed in coloured and glazed Doultonware set on washing line posts and finials in the housing estates of the St Pancras Home Improvement Society (later St Pancras Housing Assn) in Somers Town, London, and at York Rise Estate, Camden, 1920s and 1930s. Several of the figures have been destroyed or stolen. 
 Exterior bas-reliefs and interior work at the BBC Broadcasting House, London, 1931
 Six allegorical relief panels, Commercial Bank of Scotland, Bothwell Street, Glasgow, 1934–35
 A series of sporting figures outside Lord's Cricket Ground, London, 1934
 Pottery through the Ages, polychrome ceramic frieze for the London headquarters of the Royal Doulton Company, 1939
 Two memorial bronzes at the St James' Church, Warter
 Statue of Jamsetji Tata at the Indian Institute of Science, Bangalore
 Blue Robed Bambino fountain at the Centre William Rappard, Geneva (also known as Child with Fish)
 Reliefs featuring musicians on a building in Cavendish Square, London. The house had been the showroom of Brinmeads, the English piano manufacturer.

Legacy
The Victoria and Albert Museum in South Kensington has named a gallery after Bayes. In 2011 the Royal British Society of Sculptors created the Gilbert Bayes Award for early career sculptors.

References

External links

 Works by Bayes in the Victoria and Albert Museum
National Archives article
 Gilbert Bayes Trust

1872 births
1953 deaths
20th-century English sculptors
20th-century English male artists
Alumni of the City and Guilds of London Art School
Alumni of the Royal Academy Schools
British architectural sculptors
English male sculptors
Masters of the Art Worker's Guild
Olympic competitors in art competitions
Sibling artists
Sculptors from London